General Sir Edward Walter Forestier-Walker  (born Walker; 18 February 1812 – 27 July 1881) was a British Army officer who became Commander-in-Chief, Scotland.

Early life
Sir Edward was born in Dublin, the eldest son of Gen. Frederick Nathaniel Walker and Annabella Cane. His father was the younger brother of Gen. Sir George Townshend Walker, 1st Baronet. His mother died in Calais in 1829 and is buried in Boulogne.

Military career
Forestier-Walker was commissioned in 1827. He commanded the Scots Fusilier Guards at the Battle of Balaclava in October 1854, at the Battle of Inkerman in November 1854 and at the Siege of Sebastopol in Winter 1854 during the Crimean War. He became Commander-in-Chief, Scotland in 1862.

He was also colonel of the 50th Regiment of Foot from 1871 to 1881, when they became part of the new Queen's Own (Royal West Kent Regiment), after which he was briefly Colonel of the first battalion of the latter before his death later that year.

Personal life
On 20 July 1843, Forestier-Walker married Lady Jane Ogilvy-Grant, daughter of Colonel Francis Ogilvy-Grant, 6th Earl of Seafield. They had four sons:
General Sir Frederick Forestier-Walker (1844–1910), a senior military officer who was Governor of Gibraltar
Francis Lewis George Forestier Walker (2 January 1847 – February 1854), died in childhood
Douglas Henry Walter Forestier Walker (May–July 1849), died in childhood
Colonel Montagu Charles Brudenell Forestier-Walker (1853–1902), killed in a train accident while serving as Assistant Adjutant-general to the British Force in Egypt

Lady Jane died in 1861. In 1862, he married secondly to Lady Juliana Caroline Frances Knox, daughter of Thomas Knox, 2nd Earl of Ranfurly. They had a daughter, who died as an infant:
Mary Juliana Forestier Walker (born and died 1863)

He died at the Manor House in Bushey, Hertfordshire, in 1881.

References

 

1812 births
1881 deaths
Military personnel from Dublin (city)
British Army generals
Knights Commander of the Order of the Bath